Derbyshire County Cricket Club in 1964 was the  cricket season when the English club Derbyshire had been playing for ninety three years. It was their sixtieth  season in the County Championship and they won five matches to  finish twelfth in the County Championship. In the second year of the Gillette Cup they were eliminated in round 1.

1964 season

Derbyshire played 28 games in the County Championship, one match against Oxford University, and one against the touring Australians. They won five first class matches altogether and lost in the initial round of the Gillette Cup. Charles Lee was in his second season  as captain. Derek Morgan was top scorer and Brian Jackson took most wickets.

Players who made their debut for Derbyshire were Michael Page who went on to play a further eleven seasons for the club, and Michael Allen who joined the club from Northamptonshire and played for three seasons.

Matches

First Class

Gillette Cup

Statistics

Competition batting averages

Competition bowling averages

Wicket Keepers
Bob Taylor  
County Championship Catches 55, Stumping 5
Laurie Johnson 
County Championship Catches 36, Stumping 2

See also
Derbyshire County Cricket Club seasons
1964 English cricket season

References

1964 in English cricket
Derbyshire County Cricket Club seasons